Ecchi na Bani-san wa Kirai? (Japanese: エッチなバニーさんは嫌い?; "You don't hate Sexy Bunnies, Right?" localised as Do You Like Horny Bunnies?) is a bishōjo game developed by ZyX and released by G-Collections in 2001.

The game is a multi-scenario interactive eroge, although there is about five or ten minutes of clicking through dialogue before it becomes interactive. The main character is 18-year old Yukari Fujisawa, a feminine-looking Japanese boy who has never had sex with a girl. He starts working as a waiter in a membership restaurant, Platinum, where all the female employees wear Playboy bunny suits. Soon he finds out that the other waitresses, including his own cousin Sae Ishigami, have very unusual sexual tendencies.

The game features the original Japanese voices along with an English translation and is uncensored.

A sequel, Do You Like Horny Bunnies? 2,  which is set in another branch of Platinum with cameos from the original's characters, was also released in 2002.

Story
Yukari Fujisawa is a boy who works at the Platinum restaurant, an exclusive Italian eatery. He was employed for a strange and embarrassing reason: he was mistaken as a girl. The girls are good at figuring it out, but either they will either ruin his job or the discovery can make his and their jobs and lives much easier and more fun, exciting, interesting, and especially enjoyable.

Gameplay
At the beginning of the game, the player learns about Yukari Fujisawa's life. If the player selects options that do not lead the protagonist to a specific possibility too many times, Yukari will get fired, and the player will be forced back to the title screen.

Characters
Yukari Fujisawa: He is an 18-year-old boy, despite his feminine appearance. He has plenty of friends at his school. In the game, he is shown to be a decent judo student and takes care of exotic fish in his free time.

Sae Ishigami: Yukari's cousin. In their childhood, they were inseparable, but they grew distant as the years went on. They are later reunited at Platinum. Sae is an exhibitionist and therefore enjoys being watched while performing sexual acts.

Hiromi Yanagi: Sae's best pal appears to be probable to work in a bunny suit. She dresses complete with a pair of glasses and a stylish appearance. Luckily for her, she easily opens up to Yukari.

Ryo Kugenuma: Despite the fact that she is the youngest of the team, she is by far the most mature. Her serious attitude comes from her parents. Although she would seem more fitting as an executive of a major company and not a waitress in a bunny suit, she is still proud of her work at Platinum. Ryo enjoys consuming the sperm of her partner.

Chimaki Hase: The eldest of the bunnies at Platinum, despite looking young and immature. She has no shame in meeting Yukari. It is shown that Chimaki is addicted to Yukari.

Akina Inamura: She is called "The big boss of Platinum" by her co-workers. She seems to be a strange case at first and greets people in a way that she thinks is cute.

Sequel
A sequel titled "Do You Like Horny Bunnies? 2" was released in 2002. The game focuses on a new character, Kazuma Takatsuki, and the story takes place in another branch of the Platinum. The game also features cameos of characters from the original game.

References
Brief references in print:
 Braithwaite, Brenda, 2006 Sex in Video Games, Charles River Media, Boston  . Chapter 1 via Google Scholar, retrieved on March 12, 2008.
 Wired June 7, 2005, Sim Sex Not So Scintillating, Danit Lidor. Online edition retrieved on March 12, 2008.

External links

2001 video games
Eroge
Bishōjo games
Video games developed in Japan
Windows games
Windows-only games
ZyX (brand) games